Tiska Djanet Airport  is an airport serving Djanet, Algeria. There is a VOR/DME and an NDB on the field for navigation.

Airlines and destinations

References

External links 
 OurAirports - Djanet Inedbirene

 Etablissement de Gestion de Services Aéroportuaires d’Alger (EGSA Alger)
 
 

Airports in Algeria
Buildings and structures in Illizi Province